Monika Brüning (born 13 July 1951 in Bremen) is a German politician and member of the Christian Democratic Union.

External links 
 Official website 
 Bundestag biography 

1951 births
Living people
Politicians from Bremen
Members of the Bundestag for Lower Saxony
Female members of the Bundestag
21st-century German women politicians
Members of the Bundestag 2005–2009
Members of the Bundestag 2002–2005
Members of the Bundestag for the Christian Democratic Union of Germany